Highlow Hall is a historic Elizabethan manor house in Highlow civil parish, near Hathersage, Derbyshire, England. It was owned by the Eyre family from approximately 1340 to 1842, at which

point one branch of the family had already emigrated to the United States.  It is a Grade II*-listed building and dates to the late 16th century.

Highlow Hall is associated with the White Lady, a local ghost of a woman named Elizabeth Archer, said to haunt the estate.

See also
Grade II* listed buildings in Derbyshire Dales
Listed buildings in Highlow

References

Eyre family
Grade II* listed buildings in Derbyshire
Elizabethan architecture